The 1973 Cal Poly Pomona Broncos football team represented California State Polytechnic University, Pomona as a member of the California Collegiate Athletic Association (CCAA) during the 1973 NCAA Division II football season. Led by Roy Anderson in his fifth and final season as head coach, Cal Poly Pomona compiled an overall record of 4–6–1 with a mark of 1–3 in conference play, placing in a three-way tied for third in the CCAA. The team was outscored by its opponents 286 to 210 for the season. The Broncos played home games at Kellogg Field in Pomona, California.

Schedule

References

Cal Poly Pomona
Cal Poly Pomona Broncos football seasons
Cal Poly Pomona Broncos football